Ratu Dau (born 6 May 2000) is a Fijian footballer who plays as a forward for Fijian club Ba and the Fiji national team.

Club career
Dau started his career in the youth of Tavua. In 2016 he made his debut for the first team.

National team
In 2018 Dau was called up by coach Christophe Gamel for the Fiji national football team. He made his debut on July 5, 2018, in a 1–0 loss against Malaysia. He came in for Rusiate Matarerega in the 66th minute of play.

References

Fijian footballers
Association football forwards
Tavua F.C. players
Fiji international footballers
Living people
2000 births